Trient may refer to:

Trient, Switzerland, a hamlet of around 150 people in Valais, Switzerland
Trient Glacier, a glacier on Mont Blanc, Switzerland
Trient (river), Switzerland
the historic and German name for the city of Trento in Italy